Once a Year: A Poema Christmas EP is a holiday EP by American acoustic pop duo, Poema. It is the second EP released by the group on Tooth & Nail Records.

Track listing

Personnel
Elle Puckett - lead vocals, guitar
Shealeen Puckett - backing vocals, keyboards

References

2010 EPs
Poema (musical group) albums
Christmas albums by American artists
Christian music EPs
Christmas EPs